Chaltasian (also Romanized as Chāltāsīān, Chāltāsīyān, Chāltāsīyown, Chāltāsīyūn, and Chātāseyān) is a village in Asgariyeh Rural District, in the Central District of Pishva County, Tehran Province, Iran. At the 2006 census, its population was 444, in 108 families.

References

External links 

Populated places in Pishva County